Azmanabad (also Romanized as Āzmanābād; also known as Ḩamzarābād) is a village in Abtar Rural District, in the Central District of Iranshahr County, Sistan and Baluchestan Province, Iran. At the 2006 census, its population was 1,462, in 248 families.

References 

Populated places in Iranshahr County